Brigadier Robert Llewellyn Jephson Jones, GC (7 April 1905 – 27 October 1985) was a British Army officer and a recipient of the George Cross. Along with Lieutenant Bill Eastman, he was awarded the George Cross for incredible courage in dealing with some 275 unexploded bombs on the island of Malta during the Second World War.

Early life and career
The son of a clergyman, he was born on 7 April 1905 and began his officer training at Sandhurst in 1923. He was commissioned into the Duke of Wellington's Regiment in 1925, served as Adjutant of the 6th Nigeria Regiment in 1932–34 and joined the RAOC in 1936.

George Cross citation
Notice of Jephson Jones and Eastman's awards appeared in The London Gazette on Christmas Eve 1940:

Post-war
Jephson Jones died in Ferndown, Dorset, on 27 October 1985.

References

1905 births
1985 deaths
Graduates of the Royal Military College, Sandhurst
Duke of Wellington's Regiment officers
Royal Army Ordnance Corps officers
British recipients of the George Cross
British Army personnel of World War II
Bomb disposal personnel
Military personnel from Oxfordshire
British Army brigadiers